Faba bean necrotic stunt virus (FBNSV) is a pathogenic plant virus of the family Nanoviridae. Its infection cycle is remarkable because it has eight segments, each carried in a different particle, that can replicate independently in different host cells and then reassemble outside of the host cells into new complete virions.

References

Viral plant pathogens and diseases
Nanoviridae